Chinatown is located on Van Wesenbekestraat a street in Antwerp, Belgium. Historically supporting the Chinese community that settled in Antwerp post-World War II, today Chinatown is well known for its pan-Asian atmosphere. The district houses an abundance of restaurants offering a variety of Asian cuisines such as Chinese, Japanese, Indian, Pakistani, Thai and Nepali. Pan-Asian organisations and businesses supporting the Chinese, Nepali, Indonesian and Filipino communities for example are found throughout the district and the biggest Asian supermarket in the country (named Sun Wah which stocks items from China, Thailand, Japan, Korea, Philippines, Malaysia, Singapore, Vietnam, Indonesia and India) is also found in Chinatown. A Buddhist temple and a school for mastering kungfu are other commodities also found in the district. Chinese presence is still dominant. However, traders from Thailand, Nepal and other Asian countries have also settled in the district resulting in some dubbing it as Asiatown' to reflect the changing demographics. Both at the entrance and the end of the street, two Chinese lions guard the street. A paifang known as the "Pagodepoort"  (Pagoda Gate) was erected at the southern entrance to the street in 2010 after four years of planning.

Gallery

References 

Chinatowns in Europe
Restaurant districts and streets
Streets in Antwerp